The Passion is a Dutch passion play, held every Maundy Thursday since 2011 in a different city each year. The event is broadcast live on Dutch television. In 2015 and 2018, it was broadcast on radio as well.

The event began as a collaboration between the broadcasters EO and RKK. At present, it is mainly a joint effort between the broadcasters EO and KRO-NCRV.

The participating organizations consider The Passion missionary work and they see it as a chance to promote Easter and Christianity in general.

Creation 

The Dutch event and television program is partly inspired by the English local play Manchester Passion, held on Good Friday and broadcast by the BBC Three. The production company Eye2Eye Media brought the event to the Netherlands. The first Dutch version was held at the market square in Gouda, with a live broadcast on national television on Maundy Thursday 2011. It proved successful and new editions followed thereafter.

Currently, The Passion is a project between the broadcasters EO and KRO-NCRV, the Protestant and Roman Catholic churches in the Netherlands, and the Netherlands Bible Society.

Feature

Structure 

On Maundy Thursday, three days prior to Easter, the event takes place on a main square in a Dutch city. On this square, Dutch celebrities paraphrase selected Bible passages to tell the story of Easter and Jesus, with live performances of relevant Dutch pop songs in between. Throughout the years, songs from Dutch musicians such as Marco Borsato, BLØF, Guus Meeuwis and Nick & Simon have been used. Meanwhile, a group of 40 people bare a huge white cross towards the main podium in the center square. The cross has a weight of almost 900 pounds and it is nearly 20 feet tall. It is possible to follow this event online; with a second screen, people can join the procession virtually on The Passion website.

Location 

The host city is selected annually on the basis of various factors:

 The recognition amongst the Dutch population. A local theme that ties in with the story of suffering and resurrection is helpful. For example, the 2015 edition, staged in Enschede, referred to a fireworks disaster and the subsequent rebuilding of a new urban district called Roombeek.
 The presence of a large space that can carry up to 20,000 — 25,000 people. The performance stage is built in this area. Additionally, an overflow zone is required to safely disperse excess visitors, if need be.
 The possibility to adequately record the different scenes.
 The willingness of the city to provide both financial and practical contributions.

The first three editions were all held in the province of South Holland. The fourth edition, held in Groningen, was the first outside of the Randstad. Since that year, the locations are geographically spread throughout the country. The 2016 edition was staged in Amersfoort; the 2017 edition in Leeuwarden and the 2018 edition in Amsterdam Zuidoost. The 2019 edition was staged in Dordrecht. In 2020, due to the coronavirus pandemic the event was cancelled. Instead, an alternative program was broadcast from Hilversum including fragments from previous editions. In 2021 the event was held in Roermond, the city that would originally host the 2020 edition. The 2022 edition was held in Doetinchem.

Editions

2011, Gouda
The event was staged on 21 April in the old city center of Gouda. The event attracted about 20,000 visitors and it was followed by around one million viewers on television. In June 2012, the Gouda edition of The Passion won an award for best city marketing event.

2012, Rotterdam

The Rotterdam event was staged on 5 April on the Willemsplein. It was broadcast on national television and seen by 1.7 million viewers.

2013, The Hague
The event was staged on 28 March in the city center of The Hague. The procession departed from graveyard Sint Petrusbanden. The main stage of this edition was formed by the Hofvijver. Around 2.3 million viewers saw The Passion live on television.

2014, Groningen

On 17 April, The Passion was staged on the Vismarkt in Groningen. Roughly 20,000 visitors came to see the play and it had around 3.2 million television viewers.

2015, Enschede
The Passion was held on 2 April on the Hendrik Jan van Heekplein in Enschede. This year, the event was broadcast on radio as well. A total of 3,574,000 viewers watched the live television broadcasting.

2016, Amersfoort
On 2 September 2015, it was revealed that The Passion will be staged on 24 March 2016, on the Eemplein in Amersfoort.

2017, Leeuwarden
The seventh edition was held on 13 April 2017 on the Wilhelminaplein in Leeuwarden.

2018, Amsterdam
It was in De Bijlmer.

2019, Dordrecht
The ninth edition of The Passion was held on April 18 of 2019 in Dordrecht. More than 20.000 spectators were there to see Edwin Jonkers, Edsilia Rombley and many more act and sing.

2020, Hilversum (Cancelled) 
Due to the coronavirus pandemic, The Passion of 2020 was cancelled. It was supposed to be held in Roermond.
The organization looked for an alternative in mid-March, such as a performance without an audience. A television broadcast was chosen that mainly looked back on previous editions. Presenter Johnny de Mol told the Easter story live from the Media Park in Hilversum, including fragments of performances from previous years. Anne-Mar Zwart presented the "procession" next to a stationary cross. Viewers could digitally "follow" and send messages and videos. The program was entitled 10 years of The Passion: 'Now give me your fear'.

2021, Roermond
The eleventh edition of The Passion was held on a stage at Munsterplein on 1 April 2021 in Roermond. Because of the ongoing coronavirus pandemic, this edition was held without an audience. 
More than 2.5 million people watched the live broadcast on Thursday evening. 334 thousand people watched the broadcast in the following week.

2022, Doetinchem
The twelfth edition of The Passion was held in Doetinchem on 14 April 2022. Once more, this edition was held without an audience. This edition introduced the role of Mary Magdalene.

2023, Harlingen
The thirteenth edition of The Passion is scheduled to be held in Harlingen on 6 April 2023.

Cast

2010s

2020s

References

External links 
 Official website
 
 
 
 
 
 
 
 

Dutch television shows
Portrayals of Jesus on television
Passion plays